Chuktu (also Romanized as Chūktū and Chūkatū; also known as Chaktū and Chūqtū) is a village in Charuymaq-e Jonubesharqi Rural District, Shadian District, Charuymaq County, East Azerbaijan Province, Iran. At the 2006 census, its population was 61, in 13 families.

Name 
According to Vladimir Minorsky, the name Chukatū is derived from the Mongolian language and means "with small stones".

References 

Populated places in Charuymaq County